Marcela Topor (born 8 September 1976) is a Romanian journalist, and the wife of Catalan politician and journalist Carles Puigdemont, the former President of Catalonia's Generalitat. She holds a degree in English philology from the Alexandru Ioan Cuza University of Iași. Topor first met her future husband at the International Festival of Amateur Theatre of Gerona in 1996, in which she participated as an actress with the Ludic Theatre company. They married in 2000.

Topor is the editor of Catalonia Today, an English-language magazine and website based in Girona. She also hosts the television programme Catalan Connections, which features interviews in English with resident foreigners in Catalonia, broadcast on the El Punt Avui TV channel and posted to the Catalonia Today website.

The couple has two daughters. Topor speaks Spanish, English, Romanian, and Catalan.

References 

People from Vaslui
Living people
Romanian television presenters
Spanish television presenters
Romanian women television presenters
Spanish women television presenters
Spanish people of Romanian descent
Romanian emigrants to Spain
1976 births
Alexandru Ioan Cuza University alumni
Spouses of politicians
Naturalised citizens of Spain
Romanian expatriates in Spain